The Technical Higher Secondary School (THSS)  is a technical higher secondary school in Vazhakkad, Malappuram, in India.  Part of the Model Technical Higher Secondary Schools, which provides education in the technological and hi-tech sectors in the Indian state of Kerala, this school was established in 1993 in Vazhakkad and is managed by the Institute of Human Resources Development (IHRD) and promote scientific advancement, technological progress and economic growth.  Courses are conducted in English.

See also
Edavannappara

External links
Official website

Technical schools
High schools and secondary schools in Kerala
Institute of Human Resources Development
Schools in Malappuram district
Educational institutions established in 1993
1993 establishments in Kerala